Countess of Galloway is a title given to the wife of the Earl of Galloway. The title has been held by several women, including:

Anne Stewart, Countess of Galloway (née Dashwood ; 1743-1830) (wife of the 7th Earl)
Jane Stewart, Countess of Galloway (née Paget ; 1774-1842) (wife of the 8th Earl)
Harriet Stewart, Countess of Galloway (née Somerset ; 1811-1885) (wife of the 9th Earl)
Arabella Stewart, Countess of Galloway (née Cecil ; 1850-1903), sister of the 3rd Marquess of Salisbury (wife of the 10th Earl)

Title and name disambiguation pages